Nan Aye Khine born 19 September 1976) is a Burmese weightlifter who competed in the women's 48 kg at the 2004 Summer Olympics. She originally finished fourth, but tested positive for a steroid and was disqualified.

See also
List of sportspeople sanctioned for doping offences

References
Yahoo! Sports

External links
 

1976 births
Living people
Burmese female weightlifters
Weightlifters at the 2004 Summer Olympics
Olympic weightlifters of Myanmar
Doping cases in weightlifting
Burmese sportspeople in doping cases